Adoption is a 1975 Hungarian drama film directed by Márta Mészáros. It tells the story of Kata, a lonely middle-aged  female factory worker, who becomes interested in neglected children and tries to adopt one. It was entered into the 25th Berlin International Film Festival, where it won the Golden Bear. The film was also selected as the Hungarian entry for the Best Foreign Language Film at the 48th Academy Awards, but was not accepted as a nominee.

Plot summary

Cast
 Katalin Berek as Csentesné – Kata (as Berek Kati)
 Gyöngyvér Vigh as Bálint Anna
 Péter Fried as Sanyi
 László Szabó as Jóska
 István Szőke
 Flóra Kádár as Erzsi, Jóska's wife
 Janos Boross as Anna apja
 Erzsi Varga as Anna anyja
 István Kaszás as Intézetigazgató
 Anikó Kiss
 Zsófi Mészáros
 Judit Felvidéki
 Irén Rácz
 Erika Jozsi as (as Józsa Erika)
 András Szigeti

See also
 List of submissions to the 48th Academy Awards for Best Foreign Language Film
 List of Hungarian submissions for the Academy Award for Best Foreign Language Film

References

External links 
 
 
 

1975 films
1970s Hungarian-language films
Films about adoption
1975 drama films
Golden Bear winners
Films directed by Márta Mészáros
Hungarian black-and-white films
Hungarian drama films